Hyperglomeris is a genus of diplopods in the family Glomeridae.

Species
Hyperglomeris conspicua Golovatch, 1983
Hyperglomeris depigmentata Golovatch, Geoffroy & VandenSpiegel, 2013
Hyperglomeris dirupta (Silvestri, 1917)
Hyperglomeris lamellosa Silvestri, 1917
Hyperglomeris magna Golovatch, 1983
Hyperglomeris maxima Golovatch, 1983
Hyperglomeris nigra Golovatch, 2017

References

Glomerida
Millipede genera